This is a list of electoral results for the electoral district of Landsdale in Western Australian state elections.

Members for Landsdale

Election results

Elections in the 2020s

References

Western Australian state electoral results by district